CTTR may also refer to:
Crash Tag Team Racing, a racing video game set in the Crash Bandicoot universe
Chained to the Rhythm, a 2017 song by Katy Perry featured on her album Witness